Harold Franks (2 October 1891 – 1973) was a British light heavyweight professional boxer who competed in the 1920s. He won a bronze medal in Boxing at the 1920 Summer Olympics losing against Norwegian boxer Sverre Sorsdal in the semi-finals.

Franks won the inaugural Amateur Boxing Association 1920 light heavyweight title, when boxing out of the St. Pancras ABC.

References

External links
 
profile

1891 births
1973 deaths
Light-heavyweight boxers
Olympic boxers of Great Britain
Boxers at the 1920 Summer Olympics
Olympic bronze medallists for Great Britain
Olympic medalists in boxing
British male boxers
Medalists at the 1920 Summer Olympics
19th-century British people
20th-century British people